Gemson Singh (born 13 March 1995) is an Indian cricketer. He made his first-class debut on 4 February 2020, for Manipur in the 2019–20 Ranji Trophy. He made his Twenty20 debut on 19 January 2021, for Manipur in the 2020–21 Syed Mushtaq Ali Trophy.

References

External links
 

1995 births
Living people
Indian cricketers
Manipur cricketers
Place of birth missing (living people)